Colobothea pura is a species of beetle in the family Cerambycidae. It was described by Bates in 1865. It is known from Brazil.

References

pura
Beetles described in 1865
Beetles of South America